The War on I–4 was a rivalry between the Tampa Bay Storm and the Orlando Predators in the Arena Football League. The teams met at least twice and up to four times a season starting in 1991, and both were consistently at the top of the league standings. The rivalry has been compared to the Yankees – Red Sox rivalry in Major League Baseball.

Although the Tampa Bay and Orlando markets, separated by an 80-mile stretch of Interstate 4, have teams in each of the major professional sports leagues of the United States and Canada, none of the Big Five leagues had a team in both cities. Orlando has the Magic of the NBA and Orlando City SC of MLS while Tampa Bay hosts the Rays in MLB, Buccaneers in the NFL and Lightning in the NHL. Despite each market being of relatively large size in its own respective right, few leagues (especially those that have had long histories) have attempted to place teams in both cities; this has created few opportunities for the two nearby cities to form rivalries. The Arena Football League was an aberration in this regard when it approved the Orlando Predators as an expansion team in 1991, then allowed for the Pittsburgh Gladiators, a charter AFL team, to relocate to the Tampa Bay area and become the Tampa Bay Storm. The Storm and Predators became instant rivals.

The games were played either at the teams' respective home arenas. At the time the series ended, these arenas were Amway Center for Orlando and Amalie Arena (previously known as the "Ice Palace", "St. Pete Times Forum", and "Tampa Bay Times Forum") for Tampa Bay.  Games hosted by the Storm before the 1997 season were held at what is now Tropicana Field, but was known as "Florida Suncoast Dome" before 1994 and "Thunderdome" thereafter. Games hosted by the Predators until the end of the 2010 season were at Hummer Field at the Amway Arena (originally the "Orlando Arena", later "TD Waterhouse Centre"). For the 2014 season, the Predators played at CFE Arena on the campus of the University of Central Florida.

The Predators led the overall series 34–27 in regular season and playoff games combined. The sides met eight times in the AFL playoffs, with each team winning four times, twice being in the ArenaBowl, with each team winning once. Their final playoff meeting was on August 14, 2010 in the American Conference Championship game, in which Tampa Bay won 63–62 as a long field goal attempt by the Predators fell short as time expired.

The games between the teams were notable for featuring some of the highest attendances in AFL history. The ArenaBowl IX title match of September 1, 1995 drew an Arena Bowl record crowd of 25,087 to Thunderdome to see the Storm defeat the Predators by 48–35. Both teams were known to organize bus trips for supporters down Interstate 4 (hence the War on I-4) to the other city to see their squad play.

The series also had the top overall attendance record in league history when Orlando defeated Tampa Bay 46–45 in front of 28,745 at the Florida Suncoast Dome in week 6 of the 1993 AFL season.

In 2010, the rivalry resumed after a year off caused by the Arena Football League suspending operations in 2009. The rivalry ended when Orlando announced they would suspend operations following the conclusion of the 2016 season. Tampa Bay did the same following the 2017 season. The Predators were relaunched as an expansion team in the National Arena League prior to the 2019 season. The Arena Football League ceased operations after filing for 

Shortly after the Predators withdrew from the AFL, the University of South Florida, based in Tampa, and the University of Central Florida, based in Orlando, claimed the "War on I-4" name for their own sports rivalries.

Game-by-game results

References

Arena Football League in Florida
Dissolved sports rivalries
Orlando Predators
Tampa Bay Storm
1991 establishments in Florida
Sports rivalries in Florida
2016 disestablishments in Florida